The United States Commission on the Social Status of Black Men and Boys (CSSBMB) is a bipartisan, independent commission of the United States government, created in 2020, it is tasked with recommending policies to improve upon, or augment, current government programs. Established within the United States Commission on Civil Rights’ (USCCR) Office of the Staff Director and The CSSBMB will investigate potential civil rights violations affecting black males and study the disparities they experience in education, criminal justice, health, employment, fatherhood, mentorship, and violence. The CSSBMB will be responsible for producing an annual report to address the current conditions affecting black men and boys and make recommendations to improve the social conditions and provide vital guidance for Congress on effective strategies to reduce the racial disparities in education, criminal justice, health, and employment.

The authorizing legislation H.R. 1636 was introduced in the House by Congresswoman Frederica S. Wilson (D-FL) and Sen. Marco Rubio (R-FL) introduced S.2163 in the Senate. The Senate bill was unanimously passed on June 25, 2020 and enacted into law on August 14, 2020.

Vision 
As a non-partisan federal agency, the Commission leads a national discussion to address the complexity and nuances of the varying conditions affecting Black males in the history of America’s cultural landscape.

Mission 
 To conduct a systematic study of the conditions affecting Black men and boys, including homicide rates, arrest and incarceration rates, poverty, violence, fatherhood, mentorship, drug abuse, death rates, disparate income and wealth levels, school performance in all grade levels including postsecondary education and college, and health issues.
 To examine trends regarding Black males and report on the community impacts of relevant government programs within the scope such topics.
 To propose measures to alleviate and remedy the underlying causes of the conditions described in the statute, which may include recommendations of changes to the law, recommendations for how to implement related policies, and recommendations for how to create, develop, or improve upon government programs.

Commissioners 
The bipartisan, 19-member Commission will include congressional lawmakers, executive branch appointees, issue experts, activists, and other stakeholders who will examine social disparities affecting black men and boys in America. Based on its findings, the commission will issue policy recommendations to Congress, the White House, and federal agencies. The bipartisan, bicameral Caucus on the Social Status of Black Men and Boys, which Congresswoman Wilson founded and co-chairs, will craft legislation to implement those recommendations.

On November 9, 2021, Representative Frederica S. Wilson was elected Chair of the Commission. The Reverend Al Sharpton was elected as Secretary.

Dr. Marvin Williams serves as the program manager for the Commission.

References

United States Commission on Civil Rights
Social Status of Black Men and Boys
African Americans' rights organizations
2020 establishments in Washington, D.C.